Darreh Ney may refer to:
 Darreh Ney, Bagh-e Malek, Khuzestan Province
 Darreh Ney-ye Olya, Behbahan County, Khuzestan Province
 Darreh Ney-ye Sofla, Behbahan County, Khuzestan Province
 Darreh Ney, Ramhormoz, Khuzestan Province
 Darreh Ney, Kohgiluyeh and Boyer-Ahmad